Lolita is a 1962 psychological comedy-drama film directed by Stanley Kubrick and based on the 1955 novel of the same title by Vladimir Nabokov, who is also credited with writing the screenplay. The film follows Humbert Humbert, a middle-aged literature lecturer who becomes sexually infatuated with Dolores Haze (nicknamed "Lolita"), a young adolescent girl. It stars James Mason, Shelley Winters, Peter Sellers and, as the titular character, Sue Lyon.

Owing to restrictions imposed by the Motion Picture Production Code, the film toned down the most provocative aspects of the novel, sometimes leaving much to the audience's imagination. The actress who played Lolita, Sue Lyon, was 14 at the time of filming.

Lolita polarized contemporary critics for its controversial depictions of child sexual abuse. Years after its release, Kubrick expressed doubt that he would have attempted to make the film had he fully understood how severe the censorship limitations on it would be. Regardless, the film has since received critical acclaim, and was later nominated for Best Adapted Screenplay at the 35th Academy Awards.

Plot
In a remote mansion, Clare Quilty, drunk and incoherent, plays Frédéric Chopin's Polonaise in A major, Op. 40, No. 1 on the piano before being shot to death by Humbert "Hum" Humbert, a middle-aged British professor of French literature.

Four years earlier, Humbert arrives in Ramsdale, New Hampshire, intending to spend the summer before his professorship begins at Beardsley College, Ohio. He searches for a room to rent, and Charlotte Haze, a cloying, sexually frustrated widow, invites him to stay at her house. He declines until seeing her 14-year-old daughter, Dolores, affectionately nicknamed "Lolita", with whom he becomes infatuated.

To be close to Lolita, Humbert accepts Charlotte's offer and becomes a lodger in the Haze household. However, Charlotte wants all of Humbert's time for herself and tells him that she will be sending Lolita to an all-girl sleepaway camp for the summer. After the Hazes depart for camp, the maid gives Humbert a letter from Charlotte, confessing her love for him and demanding he vacate at once unless he feels the same way. The letter says that if Humbert is still in the house when she returns, Charlotte will know her love is requited, and he must marry her. Though he roars with laughter while reading the sadly heartfelt yet characteristically overblown letter, Humbert marries Charlotte.

Things turn sour for the couple in the absence of the child: glum Humbert becomes more withdrawn, and Charlotte grows increasingly unfulfilled and upset. Charlotte discovers Humbert's diary entries detailing his passion for Lolita and describing Charlotte as "obnoxious" and "brainless". In an outburst, she runs outside, but is hit by a car and dies.

Humbert arrives to pick up Lolita from camp; she does not yet know her mother is dead. They stay the night in a hotel that is handling an overflow influx of police officers attending a convention. One of the guests, a pushy, abrasive stranger, insinuates himself upon Humbert and keeps steering the conversation to his "beautiful little daughter", who is asleep upstairs. The stranger implies that he too is a policeman and repeats, too often, that he thinks Humbert is "normal". Humbert escapes the man's advances, and, the next morning, Humbert and Lolita play a "game" she learned at camp, and it is implied that they have a sexual encounter. The next day, Humbert confesses to Lolita that her mother is not sick in a hospital, as he had previously told her, but dead. Grief-stricken, she stays with Humbert. The two then commence a trip cross country, traveling from hotel to motel. In public, they act as father and daughter.

In the fall, Humbert reports to his position at Beardsley College, and enrolls Lolita in high school there. Before long, people begin to wonder about the relationship between the father and his over-protected daughter. Humbert worries about her involvement with the school play and with male classmates. One night he returns home to find Dr. Zempf, a pushy, abrasive stranger, sitting in his darkened living room. Zempf, speaking with a thick German accent, claims to be the psychologist from Lolita's school and wants to discuss her knowledge of "the facts of life". He convinces Humbert to allow Lolita to participate in the school play, for which she had been selected to play the leading role.

While attending a performance of the play, Humbert learns that Lolita has been lying about how she was spending her Saturday afternoons when she claimed to be at piano practice. They get into a row and Humbert decides to leave Beardsley College and take Lolita on the road again. Lolita objects at first but then suddenly changes her mind and seems very enthusiastic. Once on the road, Humbert realizes they are being followed by a mysterious car that never drops away but never quite catches up. When Lolita becomes sick, he takes her to the hospital. However, when he returns to pick her up, she is gone. The nurse there tells him she left with another man claiming to be her uncle and Humbert, devastated, is left without a single clue as to her disappearance or whereabouts.

Some years later, Humbert receives a letter from Mrs. Richard T. Schiller, Lolita's married name. She writes that she is now married to a man named Dick and that she is pregnant and in desperate need of money. Humbert travels to their home and demands that she tell him who kidnapped her three years earlier. She tells him it was Clare Quilty, the man that was following them, who is a famous playwright and with whom her mother had a fling in Ramsdale. She states Quilty is also the one who disguised himself as Dr. Zempf, the pushy stranger who kept crossing their path. Lolita admits she was infatuated by Quilty and also carried on an affair with him at Beardsley, then left the hospital with him when he promised her a Hollywood contract. However, he then demanded she join his bohemian lifestyle, including acting in his "art" films, which she refused.

Humbert begs Lolita to leave her husband and come away with him. She declines, reminding him that she has a baby due in three months, but apologizes for cheating. Humbert gives Lolita $13,000, explaining it is her money from the sale of her mother's house, and leaves to go shoot Quilty in his mansion. Intertitles explain that Humbert died of coronary thrombosis awaiting trial for Quilty's murder.

Cast

Production

Direction
With Nabokov's consent, Kubrick changed the order in which events unfolded by moving what was the novel's ending to the start of the film. Kubrick determined that while this sacrificed a great ending, it helped maintain interest, as he believed that interest in the novel sagged halfway through once Humbert “seduced” Lolita.

The second half contains an odyssey across the United States and though the novel was set in the 1940s, Kubrick gave it a contemporary setting, shooting many of the exterior scenes in England with some back-projected scenery shot in the United States, including upstate eastern New York, along NY 9N in the eastern Adirondacks and a hilltop view of Albany from Rensselaer, on the east bank of the Hudson. Some of the minor parts were played by Canadian and American actors, such as Cec Linder, Lois Maxwell, Jerry Stovin and Diana Decker, who were based in England at the time. Kubrick had to film in England, as much of the money to finance the movie was not only raised there but also had to be spent there. In addition, Kubrick was living in England at the time, and suffered from a deathly fear of flying. Hilfield Castle featured in the film as Quilty's "Pavor Manor".

Casting

Mason was the first choice of Kubrick and producer Harris for the role of Humbert Humbert, but he initially declined due to a Broadway engagement while recommending his daughter, Portland, for the role of Lolita. Laurence Olivier then refused the part, apparently on the advice of his agents. Kubrick considered Peter Ustinov but decided against him. Harris then suggested David Niven; Niven accepted the part but then withdrew for fear the sponsors of his TV show, Four Star Playhouse (1952), would object. Noël Coward and Rex Harrison were also considered. Mason then withdrew from his play and got the part.

The role of Clare Quilty was greatly expanded from that in the novel and Kubrick allowed Sellers to adopt a variety of disguises throughout the film. Early on in the film, Quilty appears as himself: a conceited, avant-garde playwright with a superior manner. Later he is an inquisitive policeman on the porch of the hotel, where Humbert and Lolita are staying. Next he is the intrusive Beardsley High School psychologist, Doctor Zempf, who lurks in Humbert's front room, to persuade him to give Lolita more freedom in her after-school activities. He is then seen as a photographer backstage at Lolita's play. Later in the film, he is an anonymous phone caller conducting a survey.

Jill Haworth was asked to take the role of Lolita but she was under contract to Otto Preminger and he said "no". Hayley Mills was offered the role but her parents refused permission for her to do it. Joey Heatherton, Sandra Dee and Tuesday Weld also were potential candidates for the role.

Although Vladimir Nabokov originally thought that Sue Lyon was the right selection to play Lolita, years later Nabokov said that the ideal Lolita would have been Catherine Demongeot, a French actress who had played Zazie in Zazie in the Metro (1960), followed by only a few more films.

Censorship

At the time the film was released, the ratings system was not in effect and the Hays Code, dating back to the 1930s, governed movie production. The censorship of the time inhibited Kubrick's direction; Kubrick later commented that, "because of all the pressure over the Production Code and the Catholic Legion of Decency at the time, I believe I didn't sufficiently dramatize the erotic aspect of Humbert's relationship with Lolita. If I could do the film over again, I would have stressed the erotic component of their relationship with the same weight Nabokov did." Kubrick hinted at the nature of their relationship indirectly, through double entendre and visual cues such as Humbert painting Lolita's toes. In a 1972 Newsweek interview (after the ratings system had been introduced in late 1968), Kubrick said that he "probably wouldn't have made the film" had he realized in advance how difficult the censorship problems would be.

The film is deliberately vague over Lolita's age. Kubrick commented, "I think that some people had the mental picture of a nine-year-old, but Lolita was twelve and a half in the book; Sue Lyon was thirteen." Actually, Lyon was 14 by the time filming started and 15 when it finished. Although passed without cuts, Lolita was rated "X" by the British Board of Film Censors when released in 1962, meaning no one under 18 years of age was permitted to watch.

Voice-over narration
Humbert uses the term "nymphet" to describe Lolita, which he explains and uses in the novel; it appears twice in the movie and its meaning is left undefined. In a voice-over on the morning after the Ramsdale High School dance, Humbert confides in his diary, "What drives me insane is the twofold nature of this nymphet, of every nymphet perhaps, this mixture in my Lolita of tender, dreamy childishness and a kind of eerie vulgarity. I know it is madness to keep this journal, but it gives me a strange thrill to do so. And only a loving wife could decipher my microscopic script."

Screenplay adaptation

The screenplay is credited to Nabokov, although very little of what he provided (later published in a shortened version) was used in the film itself. Nabokov, following the success of the novel, moved out to Hollywood and penned a script for a film adaptation between March and September 1960. The first draft was extremely long—over 400 pages. As producer Harris remarked, "You couldn't make it. You couldn't lift it". Nabokov remained polite about the film in public but in a 1962 interview before seeing the film, commented that it may turn out to be "the swerves of a scenic drive as perceived by the horizontal passenger of an ambulance". Kubrick and Harris rewrote the script themselves, writing carefully to satisfy the needs of the censor.

There are many differences between the Kubrick-Harris film adaptation and Nabokov's novel, including some events that were entirely omitted. Most of the sexually explicit innuendos, references and episodes in the book were taken out of the film because of the strict censorship of the 1960s; the sexual relationship between Lolita and Humbert is implied and never depicted graphically on the screen. In addition, some events in the film differ from the novel, and there are also changes in Lolita's character. Some of the differences are listed below:

Lolita's age, name, feelings and fate
Lolita's age was raised from 12 to early teens in the film to meet MPAA standards. Kubrick had been warned that censors felt strongly about using a more physically developed actress, who would be seen to be at least 14. As such, Sue Lyon was chosen for the title role, partly due to her more mature appearance.

The name "Lolita" is used only by Humbert as a private pet nickname in the novel, whereas in the film several of the characters refer to her by that name. In the book, she is referred to simply as "Lo" or "Lola" or "Dolly" by the other characters. Various critics, such as Susan Sweeney, have observed that since she never calls herself "Lolita", Humbert's pet name denies her subjectivity. Generally, the novel gives little information about her feelings.

The film is not especially focused on Lolita's feelings. In the medium of film, her character is inevitably fleshed out somewhat from the cipher that she remains in the novel. Nonetheless, Kubrick actually omits the few vignettes in the novel in which Humbert's solipsistic bubble is burst and one catches glimpses of Lolita's personal misery. Susan Bordo writes, "Kubrick chose not to include any of the vignettes from the novel which bring Lolita's misery to the forefront, nudging Humbert's obsession temporarily off center-stage. ...Nabokov's wife, Vera, insisted—rightly—on 'the pathos of Lolita's utter loneliness.'... In Kubrick's film, one good sobfest and dead mommy is forgotten. Humbert, to calm her down, has promised her a brand-new hi-fi and all the latest records. The same scene in the novel ends with Lolita sobbing, despite Humbert having plied her with gifts all day." Bordo goes on to say "Emphasizing Lolita's sadness and loss would not have jibed, of course, with the film's dedication to inflecting the 'dark' with the comic; it would have altered the overwhelmingly ironic, anti-sentimental character of the movie." When the novel briefly gives us evidence of Lolita's sadness and misery, Humbert glosses over it but the film omits nearly all of these episodes.

Professor Humbert
Critic Greg Jenkins believes that Humbert is imbued with a fundamental likability in this film that he does not necessarily have in the novel. He has a debonair quality in the film, while in the novel he can be perceived as much more repulsive. Humbert's two mental breakdowns leading to sanatorium stays before meeting Lolita are entirely omitted in the film, as are his earlier unsuccessful relationships with women his own age whom he refers to in the novel as "terrestrial women" through which he tried to stabilize himself. His lifelong complexes around young girls are largely concealed in the film, and Lolita appears older than her novelistic counterpart, both leading Jenkins to comment "A story originally told from the edge of a moral abyss is fast moving toward safer ground." In short, the novel early flags Humbert as both mentally unsound and obsessively infatuated with young girls in a way the film never does.

Jenkins notes that Humbert even seems a bit more dignified and restrained than other residents of Ramsdale, particularly Lolita's aggressive mother, in a way that invites the audience to sympathize with Humbert. Humbert is portrayed as someone urbane and sophisticated trapped in a provincial small town populated by slightly lecherous people, a refugee from Old World Europe in an especially crass part of the New World. For example, Lolita's piano teacher comes across in the film as aggressive and predatory compared to which Humbert seems fairly restrained. The film character of John Farlow talks suggestively of "swapping partners" at a dance in a way that repels Humbert. Jenkins believes that in the film it is Quilty, not Humbert, who acts as the embodiment of evil. The expansion of Quilty's character and the way Quilty torments Humbert also invites the audience to sympathize with Humbert.

Because Humbert narrates the novel, his increased mental deterioration due to anxiety in the entire second half of the story is more obvious from the increasingly desperate tone of his narrative. While the film shows Humbert's increasingly severe attempts to control Lolita, the novel shows more of Humbert's loss of self-control and stability.

Jenkins also notes that some of Humbert's more brutal actions are omitted or changed from the film. For example, in the novel he threatens to send Lolita to a reformatory, while in the film he promises to never send her there. He also notes that Humbert's narrative style in the novel, although elegant, is wordy, rambling, and roundabout, whereas in the film it is "subdued and measured".

Humbert's infatuation with "nymphets" in the novel
The film entirely omits the critical episode in Humbert's life in which at age 14 he was interrupted making love to young Annabel Leigh who shortly thereafter died, and consequently omits all indications that Humbert had a preoccupation with prepubescent girls prior to meeting Dolores Haze. In the novel, Humbert gives his youthful amorous relationship with Annabel Leigh, thwarted by both adult intervention and her death, as the key to his obsession with nymphets. The film's only mention of "nymphets" is an entry in Humbert's diary specifically revolving around Lolita.

Humbert explains that the smell and taste of youth filled his desires throughout adulthood: "that little girl with her seaside limbs and ardent tongue haunted [him] ever since". He thus claims that "Lolita began with Annabel" and that Annabel's spell was broken by "incarnating her in another".

The idea that anything connected with young girls motivated Humbert to accept the job as professor of French Literature at Beardsley College and move to Ramsdale at all is entirely omitted from the film. In the novel he first finds accommodations with the McCoo family because the McCoos have a twelve-year-old daughter, a potential "enigmatic nymphet whom [he] would coach in French and fondle in Humbertish." However, the McCoo house happens to burn down in the few days prior to his arrival, and this is when Mrs. Haze offers to accommodate Humbert.

Humbert's attitudes to Charlotte
Susan Bordo has noticed that in order to show the callous and cruel side of Humbert's personality early in the film, Nabokov and Kubrick have shown additional ways in which Humbert behaves monstrously towards her mother, Charlotte Haze. He mocks her declaration of love towards him, and takes a pleasant bath after her accidental death. This effectively replaces the voice-overs in which he discusses his plans to seduce and molest Lolita as a means of establishing Humbert as manipulative, scheming, and selfish. However, Greg Jenkins has noted that Humbert's response to Charlotte's love note in the film is still much kinder than that in the novel, and that the film goes to significant lengths to make Charlotte unlikable.

Expansion of Clare Quilty
Quilty's role is greatly magnified in the film and brought into the foreground of the narrative. In the novel, Humbert catches only brief uncomprehending glimpses of his nemesis before their final confrontation at Quilty's home, and the reader finds out about Quilty late in the narrative along with Humbert. Quilty's role in the story is made fully explicit from the beginning of the film, rather than being a concealed surprise twist near the end of the tale. In a 1962 interview with Terry Southern, Kubrick describes his decision to expand Quilty's role, saying "just beneath the surface of the story was this strong secondary narrative thread possible—because after Humbert seduces her in the motel, or rather after she seduces him, the big question has been answered—so it was good to have this narrative of mystery continuing after the seduction." This magnifies the book's theme of Quilty as a dark double of Humbert, mirroring all of Humbert's worst qualities, a theme which preoccupied Kubrick.

The film opens with a scene near the end of the story, Humbert's murder of Quilty. This means that the film shows Humbert as a murderer before showing us Humbert as a seducer of minors, and the film sets up the viewer to frame the following flashback as an explanation for the murder. The film then goes back to Humbert's first meeting with Charlotte Haze and continues chronologically until the final murder scene is presented once again. The book, narrated by Humbert, presents events in chronological order from the very beginning, opening with Humbert's life as a child. While Humbert hints throughout the novel that he has committed murder, its actual circumstances are not described until near the very end. NPR's Bret Anthony Johnston notes that the novel is sort of an inverted murder mystery: the reader knows someone has been killed, but the reader has to wait to find out who the victim is. 
Similarly, the online Doubleday publisher's reading guide to Lolita notes "the mystery of Quilty's identity turns this novel into a kind of detective story (in which the protagonist is both detective and criminal)." This effect is, of course, lost in the Kubrick film.

In the novel, Miss Pratt, the school principal at Beardsley, discusses with Humbert Dolores's behavioral issues and among other things persuades Humbert to allow her to participate in the dramatics group, especially one upcoming play. In the film, this role is replaced by Quilty disguised as a school psychologist named "Dr. Zempf". This disguise does not appear in the novel at all. In both versions, a claim is made that Lolita appears to be "sexually repressed", as she mysteriously has no interest in boys. Both Dr. Zempf and Miss Pratt express the opinion that this aspect of her youth should be developed and stimulated by dating and participating in the school's social activities. While Pratt mostly wants Humbert to let Dolores generally into the dramatic group, Quilty (as Zempf) is specifically focused on the high school play (written by Quilty and produced with some supervision from him) which Lolita has secretly rehearsed for (in both the film and novel). In the novel Miss Pratt naïvely believes this talk about Dolores' "sexual repression", while Quilty in his disguise knows the truth. Although Peter Sellers is playing only one character in this film, Quilty's disguise as Dr. Zempf allows him to employ a mock German accent that is quintessentially in the style of Sellers's acting.

With regard to this scene, playwright Edward Albee's 1981 stage adaptation of the novel follows Kubrick's film rather than the novel.

The movie retains the novel's theme of Quilty (anonymously) goading Humbert's conscience on many occasions, though the details of how this theme is played out are quite different in the film. He has been described as "an emanation of Humbert's guilty conscience", and Humbert describes Quilty in the novel as his "shadow".

The first and last word of the novel is "Lolita". As film critic Greg Jenkins has noted, in contrast to the novel, the first and last word of the screenplay is "Quilty".

Contemplating murder of Charlotte Haze
In the novel, Humbert and Charlotte go swimming in Hourglass Lake, where Charlotte announces she will ship Lo off to a good boarding school; that part takes place in bed in the film. Humbert's contemplation of possibly killing Charlotte similarly takes place at Hourglass Lake in the book, but at home in the film. This difference affects Humbert's contemplated method of killing Charlotte. In the book he is tempted to drown her in the lake, whereas in the film he considers the possibility of shooting her with a pistol while in the house, in both scenarios concluding that he could never bring himself to do it. In his biography of Kubrick, Vincent LoBrutto notes that Kubrick tried to recreate Hourglass Lake in a studio, but became uncomfortable shooting such a pivotally important exterior scene in the studio, so he refashioned the scene to take place at home. Susan Bordo notes that after Charlotte's actual death in the film, two neighbors see Humbert's gun and falsely conclude Humbert is contemplating suicide, while in fact he had been contemplating killing Charlotte with it.

The same attempted killing of Charlotte appears in the "Deleted Scenes" section of the DVD of the 1997 film (now put back at Hourglass Lake). In the novel Humbert really considers killing Charlotte and later Lolita accuses Humbert of having deliberately killed her. Only the first scene is in the 1962 film and only the latter scene appears in the 1997 film.

Lolita's friends at school
Lolita's friend, Mona Dahl, is a friend in Ramsdale (the first half of the story) in the film and disappears quite early in the story. In the film, Mona is simply the host of a party which Lolita abandons early in the story. Mona is a friend of Lolita's in Beardsley (the second half of the story) in the novel. In the novel Mona is active in the school play, Lolita tells Humbert stories about Mona's love life, and Humbert notes Mona had "long since ceased" to be (if ever she was) a "nymphet". Mona has already had an affair with a Marine and appears to be flirting with Humbert. She keeps Lolita's secrets and helps Lolita lie to Humbert when Humbert discovers that Lolita has been missing her piano lessons. In the film, Mona in the second half seems to have been replaced by a "Michele" who is also in the play and having an affair with a Marine and backs up Lolita's fibs to Humbert. Film critic Greg Jenkins claims that Mona has simply been entirely eliminated from the film.

Humbert is suspicious that Lolita is developing an interest in boys at various times throughout the story. He suspects no one in particular in the novel. In the film, he is twice suspicious of a pair of boys, Rex and Roy, who hang out with Lolita and her friend Michele. In the novel, Mona has a friend named Roy.

Other differences
In the novel, the first mutual attraction between Humbert and Lolita begins because Humbert resembles a celebrity she likes. In the film, it occurs at a drive-in horror film when she grabs his hand. The scene is from Christopher Lee's The Curse of Frankenstein when the monster removes his mask. Christine Lee Gengaro proposes that this suggests that Humbert is a monster in a mask, and the same theory is developed at greater length by Jason Lee. As in the novel, Lolita shows affection for Humbert before she departs for summer camp.

In the novel, both the hotel at which Humbert and Dolores first have relations and the stage-play by Quilty for which Dolores prepares to perform in at her high school is called The Enchanted Hunter. However, in the novel school headmistress Pratt erroneously refers to the play as The Hunted Enchanter. In Kubrick's film, the hotel bears the same name as in the novel, but now the play really is called The Hunted Enchanter. Both names are established only through signage – the banner for the police convention at the hotel and the marquee for the play – the names are never mentioned in dialogue.
 
The relationships between Humbert and other women before and after Lolita are omitted from the film. Greg Jenkins sees this as part of Kubrick's general tendency to simplify his narratives, also noting that the novel therefore gives us a more "seasoned" view of Humbert's taste in women.

Only the film has a police convention at the hotel where Humbert’s moral crisis comes to a head: whether to allow Lolita to seduce him, or to instead reject her advances and choose to behave as best he can as her stepfather. Kubrick scholar Michel Ciment sees this as typical of Kubrick's general tendency to assail authority figures.

Lolita completes the school play (written by Clare Quilty) in the film, but drops out prior to finishing it in the novel. In the film, we see that Quilty's play has suggestive symbolism, and Humbert's confrontation with Lolita over her missing her piano lessons occurs after her triumphal debut in the play's premiere.

Music
The music for the film was composed by Nelson Riddle (the main theme was by Bob Harris). The recurring dance number first heard on the radio when Humbert meets Lolita in the garden later became a hit single under the name "Lolita Ya Ya" with Sue Lyon credited with the singing on the single version. The flip side was a 60s-style light rock song called "Turn off the Moon" also sung by Sue Lyon. "Lolita Ya Ya" was later recorded by other bands; it was also a hit single for The Ventures, reaching 61 on the Billboard Hot 100. A review in Billboard stated, "There've been a number of versions of the title tune from the hit film Lolita but this figures the strongest to date. The usual Ventures guitar sound is neatly augmented with voices."

Reception

Lolita premiered on June 13, 1962, in New York City (the copyright date onscreen is 1961). It performed fairly well with little advertising, relying mostly on word-of-mouth; many critics seemed uninterested or dismissive of the film while others gave it glowing reviews. However, the film was very controversial, due to the hebephilia-related content.

Among the positive reviews, Bosley Crowther of The New York Times wrote that the film was "conspicuously different" from the novel and had "some strange confusions of style and mood", but nevertheless had "a rare power, a garbled but often moving push toward an off-beat communication." Richard L. Coe of The Washington Post called it "a peculiarly brilliant film", with a tone "not of hatred, but of mocking true. Director and author have a viewpoint on modern life that is not flattering but it is not despising, either. It is regret for the human comedy." Philip K. Scheuer of the Los Angeles Times declared that the film "manages to hit peaks of comedy shrilly dissonant but on an adult level, that are rare indeed, and at the same time to underline the tragedy in human communication, human communion, between people who've got their signals hopelessly crossed." The Monthly Film Bulletin wrote that the primary themes of the film were "obsession and incongruity", and since Kubrick was "an intellectual director with little feeling for erotic tension ... one is the more readily disposed to accept Kubrick's alternative approach as legitimate." In a generally positive review for The New Yorker, Brendan Gill wrote that "Kubrick is wonderfully self-confident; his camera having conveyed to us within the first five minutes that it can perform any wonders its master may require of it, he proceeds to offer us a succession of scenes broadly sketched and broadly acted for laughs, and laugh we do, no matter how morbid the circumstances." Arlene Croce in Sight & Sound wrote that "Lolita is—in its way—a good film." She found Nabokov's screenplay "a model of adaptation" and the cast "near-perfect", though she described Kubrick's attempts at eroticism as "perfunctory and misguided" and thought his "gift for visual comedy is as faint as his depiction of sensuality."

Variety had a mixed assessment, calling the film "occasionally amusing but shapeless", and likening it to "a bee from which the stinger has been removed. It still buzzes with a sort of promising irreverence, but it lacks the power to shock and eventually makes very little point either as comedy or satire." Harrison's Reports was negative, writing, "You don't have to be an emulating, prissyish uncle from Dubuque to say that the film leaves you with a feeling that is repulsively disgusting in much of its telling," adding that "even if the exhibitor makes a dollar on the booking, he may feel a sense of shame as he plods his weary way down to the bank." Stanley Kauffmann of The New Republic called Lolita "tantalizingly unsatisfactory". 
 
The film has been re-appraised by critics over time, and currently has a score of 91% on review aggregator website Rotten Tomatoes based on 43 reviews and with an average rating of 7.81/10. The critical consensus reads: "Kubrick's Lolita adapts its seemingly unadaptable source material with a sly comedic touch and a sterling performance by James Mason that transforms the controversial novel into something refreshingly new without sacrificing its essential edge." Metacritic gives the film a score of 79 out of 100, based on reviews by 14 critics, indicating "generally favorable reviews". Filmmaker David Lynch has said that Lolita is his favourite Kubrick film.

The film was a commercial success. Produced on a budget of around $2 million, Lolita grossed $9,250,000 domestically. During its initial run, the movie earned an estimated $4.5 million in North American rentals.

Years after the film's release it has been re-released on VHS, Laserdisc, DVD, and Blu-ray. It earned $3.7 million in rentals in the US on VHS.

Awards and honors

Alternate versions
 The scene where Lolita first "seduces" Humbert as he lies on the cot is approximately 10 seconds longer in the British and Australian cut of the film. In the U.S. edition, the shot fades as she whispers the details of the "game" she played with Charlie at camp. In the UK/Australian print, the shot continues as Humbert mumbles that he's not familiar with the game. She then bends down again to whisper more details. Kubrick then cuts to a closer shot of Lolita's face as she says "Well, alrighty then" and then fades as she begins to descend onto Humbert on the cot. The latter cut of the film was used for the Region 1 DVD release. It is also the version aired on Turner Classic Movies in the U.S.
 The Criterion LaserDisc release is the only one to use a transfer approved by Stanley Kubrick. This transfer alternates between a 1.33 and a 1.66 aspect ratio (as does the Kubrick-approved Strangelove transfer). All subsequent releases to date have been 1.66 (which means that all the 1.33 shots are slightly matted).

Other film adaptations

Lolita was filmed again in 1997, directed by Adrian Lyne, starring Jeremy Irons as Humbert, Melanie Griffith as Charlotte and Dominique Swain as Lolita. The film was widely publicized as being more faithful to Nabokov than the Kubrick film. Although many observed this was the case (such as Erica Jong writing in The New York Observer), the film was not as well received as Kubrick's version, and was a major box office bomb, first shown on the Showtime cable network, then released theatrically, grossing only $1 million at the US box office based on a $62 million budget.

See also
 List of American films of 1962

References

Further reading

External links

 
 
 
 
 

1962 films
1962 comedy-drama films
American black-and-white films
American comedy-drama films
American nonlinear narrative films
American romantic drama films
British black-and-white films
British comedy-drama films
British nonlinear narrative films
Censored films
Films about child sexual abuse
Films about educators
Films about orphans
Films based on American novels
Films based on works by Vladimir Nabokov
Films directed by Stanley Kubrick
Films scored by Nelson Riddle
Films set in New Hampshire
Films set in Ohio
Films set in the 1950s
Films shot at Associated British Studios
Incest in film
Juvenile sexuality in films
Metro-Goldwyn-Mayer films
Obscenity controversies in film
Sexual-related controversies in film
Rating controversies in film
Film controversies
1960s English-language films
1960s American films
1960s British films